The cranberry is a group of evergreen dwarf shrubs, bearing the fruit named after such.

Cranberry may also refer to:

Places

Canada
Cranberry, British Columbia, a community
Cranberry Portage, Manitoba, a community

United States
Cranberry Isles, Maine
Cranberry Street Tunnel, New York City, New York
Cranberry Township (disambiguation), the name of five townships in the United States
Cranberry Wilderness, West Virginia
Cranberry Prairie, Ohio, an unincorporated community
Cranberry Glades Botanical Area, West Virginia
Tannersville Cranberry Bog, a protected bog in Tannersville, Pennsylvania
Cranberry Lake, Wisconsin, an unincorporated community
Cranberry Marsh, Wisconsin, an unincorporated community
Cranberry, Luzerne County, Pennsylvania, an unincorporated community
Cranberry, Venango County, Pennsylvania, an unincorporated community

Waters
Cranberry River (disambiguation)
Cranberry Lake, New York, United States
Cranberry Lake (Nova Scotia) (disambiguation), Canada
Little Cranberry Lake (disambiguation)

Things
Cranberry sauce, a sauce or relish made out of cranberries
Cranberry glass, a red glass
Cranberry morpheme, a type of bound morpheme in linguistic morphology
Chilean cranberry also known as New Zealand cranberry Ugni molinae

Music
The Cranberries, an Irish rock band

See also
Cranbury (disambiguation)